Euphorbia kischenensis is a species of plant in the family Euphorbiaceae. It is endemic to Yemen.  Its natural habitats are subtropical or tropical dry forests and subtropical or tropical dry shrubland.

References

Endemic flora of Socotra
kischenensis
Least concern plants
Taxonomy articles created by Polbot